Business Process Validation (BPV) is the act of verifying that a set of end-to-end business processes function as intended. If there are problems in one or more business applications that support a business process, or in the integration or configuration of those systems, then the consequences of disruption to the business can be serious. A company might be unable to take orders or ship product – which can directly impact company revenue, reputation, and customer satisfaction. It can also drive additional expenses, as defects in production are much more expensive to fix than if identified earlier. For this reason, a key aim of Business Process Validation is to identify defects early, before new enterprise software is deployed in production so that there is no business impact and the cost of repairing defects is kept to a minimum.

Note: BPV is unrelated to Validation (drug manufacture) by the U.S. Food and Drug Administration.

During Business Process Validation (BPV), the business process is checked step-by-step using representative data to confirm that all business rules are working correctly and that all underlying transactions are performing properly across every enterprise application used in the business process.  When defects are identified, these problems are logged for repair by IT personnel, business analysts or the software vendor, as appropriate.

Business Process Validation can be performed on various timescales, including the following:
 Project basis, when new enterprise software systems (such as mobile, cloud, or web applications) are being deployed for the first time
 Periodic basis, when there are regular monthly, quarterly, or annual updates to enterprise software
 Continuous basis, when companies want to validate the readiness of their processes and enterprise systems 24/7/365

Business Process Validation Methods

Manual 
Manual Business Process Validation is where one or more people (typically a cross-functional team) work at keyboards or mobile devices to execute the various business process steps directly in the enterprise software by hand. Defects are manually noted and typically logged in a defect tracking system.

There are several shortcomings to the manual approach. First, since all data is entered by hand, it can be time consuming for subject matter experts and business analysts. These are expensive staff resources that could be deployed on other higher value activities.  Second, manual testing extends project timelines.  This slows the deployment of innovation and makes business users wait longer for cost saving and revenue generating new technology. Third, the manual process is often incomplete, since the time-intensive nature means that IT teams cannot test all business processes, given their resource constraints.  This lack of coverage introduces technology risk in a company’s business processes.  Finally, if business process validation is done manually by IT teams, then business requirements and processes have to be unambiguously documented in advance, which is a time-consuming task.

Automated 
Automated Business Process Validation relies on software to execute the various business process steps directly in the enterprise software systems in an automated fashion.  BPV software automatically uses standard business process data during the validation, and interprets the correctness of each transaction and result. Defects are automatically noted and logged.

With BPV software, the business process must first be "captured" in the BPV software system so that it can be automatically executed. This amounts to performing the business process once in the enterprise system with the BPV software running in the background to capture the process. Once the business process is captured, BPV software allows the business process automation to be modified with very little effort.  Some BPV software have object-oriented designs that allow sub-processes to be shared among different end-to-end business processes, and business process automation can be easily copied and modified. This last feature is particularly helpful when companies have variations of business processes across geographies or business units.  For example, an order shipment process in Europe may differ slightly from the same process in North America because there are differences in compliance requirements and Bills of Lading.  There is no need to capture the second process end-to-end for automation purposes. The first process can easily be copied and modified in the BPV software. This enables companies to efficiently and quickly build their portfolio of business processes for automated validation.

An ancillary benefit is that once the business process is correctly captured, BPV software allows a complete and accurate description of the business process to be printed. This documentation is generated automatically with no additional effort and is useful for training, regulatory compliance, and other purposes. It is available on-demand and is typically very accurate because it is based on the most recent versions of systems and business practices. 
BPV software largely avoids the shortcomings of manual business process validation. The automation software can be configured to validate business processes on a 24/7/365 basis, if desired by the user. The frequency of automation enables any defects in underlying business systems and interfaces to be detected and repaired quickly, before business users are impacted.

Automated business process validation is a way to ensure that a company’s business processes continue to work, even when mission critical enterprise systems change.

See also 
 Process validation

References

Software testing
Formal methods
Software quality
Enterprise modelling
Business process management